Production history of The Rochester Community Players

Performance locations

German House: Gregory Street, Rochester NY

Lyceum: The former Lyceum Theater, Clinton Avenue, Rochester

Playhouse: The RCP Playhouse, South Clinton Avenue and Goodman Street, Rochester

East High School: East High School (Rochester, New York) Auditorium

Xerox Auditorium: The auditorium at the Xerox Tower, South Clinton and Broad Street, Rochester

Nazareth: Performing Arts Center Auditorium, Nazareth College

MCC: Monroe Community College Auditorium, Brighton NY

The Harley School: Clover Street, Pittsford NY

Holiday Inn Downtown: 120 East Main Street, Rochester

Bottsford: the former orcott-Bottsford School of Dance, East Avenue, Pittsford

New Life: New Life Presbyterian Church, Monroe Avenue & Rosedale Street, Rochester

Highland Bowl: Highland Park Bowl, South Avenue, Rochester

Theater Arts Playhouse: Five Mile Line Road, Penfield NY

Blessed Sacrament: Blessed Sacrament Church, Monroe Avenue, Rochester

RAPA: Rochester Academy of Performing Arts, East Main Street, Rochester

MuCCC: Multiple-use Community Cultural Center, 142 Atlantic Avenue, Rochester

1920s

1930s

1940s

1950s

1960s

1970s

1980s

1990s

2000s

2010s

References

Community theatre
Theatre company production histories